Acmaegenius is a genus of broad-nosed weevils in the beetle family Curculionidae. There are at least two described species in Acmaegenius.

Species
These two species belong to the genus Acmaegenius:
 Acmaegenius granicollis Van Dyke, 1927 i c
 Acmaegenius hylobinus LeConte, 1876 i c b
Data sources: i = ITIS, c = Catalogue of Life, g = GBIF, b = Bugguide.net

References

Further reading

 
 
 
 

Entiminae
Articles created by Qbugbot